The men's decathlon event at the 2002 Asian Athletics Championships was held in Colombo, Sri Lanka on 11–12 August.

Results

References

2002 Asian Athletics Championships
Combined events at the Asian Athletics Championships